Cibinong Poetra Football Club (simply known as Cibinong Poetra) is an Indonesian football club based in Bogor Regency, West Java. They currently compete in the Liga 3.

References

External links

Bogor Regency
Sport in West Java
Football clubs in Indonesia
Football clubs in West Java
Association football clubs established in 2000
2000 establishments in Indonesia